Bardella is a surname. Notable people with this surname are:

Jordan Bardella (born 1995),  French politician and spokesman of the National Rally Party
Rodolfo José da Silva Bardella (born 1992), Brazilian midfielder footballer

See also 
 Bardello
 Bardellino (disambiguation)